Christian Jason Bowman is an actor, director, producer, and screenwriter who has appeared in television shows and films including North Shore, Lost, Prison Break, Sin City: A Dame to Kill For, and Magnum PI.

Biography
Christian Bowman's early years were spent up and down the California coast camping out of a VW Bus before leaving to travel the world as a teenager. When he was seventeen years old, he was involved in a car accident after traveling from Rome, Italy to Chicago, Illinois near Route 66. Four people were killed in the car accident including Bowman's mother, Carolyn Walsh (44), and his girlfriend, Sonia Herzog (21). Christian was the only survivor from his car. The two people in the second vehicle that died were Patricia Shaftic (55), and Katy Sinn (9). Katy's twin sister, Jennifer (9), and her brother, Mike (12), survived.

Bowman continued to travel throughout North America, Africa and Europe after his recovery while establishing a home base with his family on the North Shore of Oahu in Hawaii. He later joined his uncle, skydiver James Darby, in business at Skydive Palm Beach in Florida until Darby's untimely death in a freak skysurfing accident. Christian moved back to Honolulu, Hawaii and his son, Bodhi, was born on May 21, 2001.

He began his acting career on the television show North Shore before being cast as Steve Jenkins, a plane survivor often confused with the character "Scott", on the first season of Lost. Bowman later joined the cast of Prison Break as Agent King, and can be seen in numerous television shows and feature films like Sin City: A Dame to Kill For, and Magnum PI.

In addition to acting, directing, producing, and writing, Christian has worked extensively in Advertising and Commercial production. He holds a Bachelors of Science in Radio Television Film from the University of Texas at Austin, where he was the recipient of the Excellence in Producing award by the Longhorns Creative Foundation. While in Austin, Texas, Bowman provided philanthropy work for a Public Broadcasting Services television show as well as Human Trafficking Awareness campaigns with Mathew McConaughey through Christian's marketing media production company, Last Pull Productions. Before moving back to his home in Honolulu, Hawaii, he worked in Los Angeles with the Screen Actors Guild and the Los Angeles Film School. Bowman is a member of the MBA Cohort at the Shidler College of Business through the University of Hawaiʻi at Mānoa, and also works as Chief Creative Officer for Sight and Sound Productions.

Film

Television

References

External links

Christian Bowman Official Website
Overcome The Podcast
Christian Bowman on Facebook
Christian Bowman on Twitter
Christian Bowman on Linkedin
https://www.shidler.hawaii.edu/scholarship-luncheon

1975 births
Living people
American male film actors
American male television actors
Shidler College of Business alumni